Jonathan 'Jon' Walshaw (born 1967), is a male retired cyclist who competed for England.

Cycling career
He represented England and competed in the 10 mile scratch race and 1 km time trial and won a bronze medal in the 4,000 metres team pursuit event, with Chris Boardman, Rob Muzio, Guy Rowland and Gary Coltman, at the 1986 Commonwealth Games in Edinburgh, Scotland.

Walshaw was a British track champion, winning the British National Omnium Championships in 1988. He was a professional from 1988-1993.

References

1967 births
English male cyclists
Commonwealth Games medallists in cycling
Commonwealth Games bronze medallists for England
Cyclists at the 1986 Commonwealth Games
Living people
Medallists at the 1986 Commonwealth Games